Dolichothrix is a genus of flowering plants in the family Asteraceae.

There is only one known species,  Dolichothrix ericoides, endemic to the Cape Province region of South Africa.

References

Gnaphalieae
Endemic flora of South Africa
Monotypic Asteraceae genera